Mehdi Baghdad (born 13 April 1985) is a French mixed martial artist who fights out of Los Angeles, California. He previously fought for the UFC in the lightweight division. He was a contestant on The Ultimate Fighter 22: Team McGregor vs Team Faber.

Mixed martial arts career 
Baghdad started training at the age of 16 and had his first fight at the age of 20. He went on to become a world champion in Muay Thai, WKBC also lightweight champion in RFA MMA. Baghdad is inspired by his father who died when he was young, and former world champion boxer Prince Naseem Hamed. Baghdad's first loss was handed to him by UFC competitor Charles Oliveira. Baghdad's nickname is Sultan, which in Arabic means High King / Emperor.

The Ultimate Fighter
Baghdad joined the Ultimate Fighter 22: Team McGregor vs Team Faber. Baghdad defeated Artem Lobov via majority decision after two rounds. He then joined McGregor's team (European team). Unfortunately Julian Erosa defeated Mehdi Baghdad via majority decision after two rounds in the preliminary fights, this would eliminate him from the tournament.

Ultimate Fighting Championship 
Despite losing TUF 22 Baghdad would still be signed by the promotion and would have his first match against Chris Wade on UFC Fight Night 81 on 17 January 2016. Baghdad would lose 4 minutes and 30 seconds into the first round by tapping out to the rear - naked choke.

Baghdad was expected to face John Makdessi on 4 June 2016 at UFC 199 but was rescheduled to 7 July 2016 at UFC Fight Night 90. Makdessi was awarded a split decision victory.

Baghdad was scheduled to face Jon Tuck on 15 October 2016 at UFC Fight Night 97. However, Baghdad pulled out of the fight in mid-September citing injury and was replaced by promotional newcomer Alex Volkanovski. In turn, Baghdad was released from the promotion.

The Ultimate Fighter: Redemption
In February 2017, it was revealed that Baghdad would again compete on the UFC's reality show in the 25th season on The Ultimate Fighter: Redemption. Baghdad was the second pick overall for Team Garbrandt. He faced Jesse Taylor in the opening round and lost via unanimous decision.

Post UFC 
Baghdad faced Thibault Gouti for the LTDE Super Lightweight belt on 2 July 2021 at Trophee des Etoiles 15. Baghdad lost the bout via TKO in the first round.

Mixed martial arts record

|-
|Loss
|align=center|12–7
|Thibault Gouti
|TKO (punches)
|Trophee des Etoiles 15
|
|align=center|1
|align=center|N/A
|Aix-en-Provence, France
|
|-
|Win
|align=center|12–6
|Erivan Pereira
|Decision (split)
|Brave 25
|
|align=center|3
|align=center|5:00
|Belo Horizonte, Brazil
|  
|-
|Loss
|align=center|11–6
|Pawel Kielek
|Decision (unanimous)
|Brave 12 - KHK Legacy
|
|align=center|3
|align=center|5:00
|Jakarta, Indonesia
|  
|-
|Loss
|align=center|11–5
|John Makdessi
|Decision (split)
|UFC Fight Night: dos Anjos vs. Alvarez
|
|align=center|3
|align=center|5:00
|Las Vegas, Nevada, United States
|  
|-
|Loss
|align=center|11–4
|Chris Wade
|Submission (rear-naked choke)
| UFC Fight Night: Dillashaw vs. Cruz 
|
|align=center|1
|align=center|4:30
|Boston, Massachusetts, United States
|
|-
| Win
| align=center| 11–3
| Zach Juusola
| TKO (punches)
| RFA 21 - Juusola vs. Baghdad
| 
| align=center| 4
| align=center| 2:37
| Costa Mesa, California, United States
| 
|-
| Win
| align=center| 10–3
| Evan Delong
| TKO (punches)
| RFA 18 - Manzanares vs. Pantoja 
| 
| align=center| 1
| align=center| 1:55
| Albuquerque, New Mexico, United States
|
|-
| Win
| align=center| 9–3
| Nicholas Christy
| Submission (choke)
| West Coast FC 7: Griffin vs. Gonzalez 
| 
| align=center| 2
| align=center| 4:57
| Sacramento, California, United States
|
|-
| Win
| align=center| 8–3
| Dionisio Ramirez
| Submission (choke)
| BAMMA USA: Badbeat 11
| 
| align=center| 2
| align=center| 1:53
| Commerce, California, United States
| 
|-
| Win
| align=center| 7–3
| Tom Douglas 
| TKO (punches)
| Gladiator Challenge: Summer Heat 
| 
| align=center| 1
| align=center| 0:42
| San Jacinto, California, United States
| 
|-
| Win
| align=center| 6–3
| Dominic Gutierrez
| Submission (anaconda choke)
| All Star Boxing 
| 
| align=center| 2
| align=center| 2:31
| Oceanside, California, United States
| 
|-
| Win
| align=center| 5–3
| Mike Sandez
| KO (punch)
|  Marconi Fight Night
| 
| align=center| 1
| align=center| 2:30
| Tustin, California, United States
| 
|-
| Loss
| align=center| 4–3
| Yves Landu
| Decision (unanimous) 
| 100% Fight 5 
| 
| align=center| 2
| align=center| 5:00
| Paris, France
| 
|-
| Win
| align=center| 4–2
| Randall Jimenez
| TKO (soccer kicks and punches)
| Xtreme Vale Todo 5: Franca vs. Kheder
| 
| align=center| 1
| align=center| 0:37
| Cartago, Costa Rica
| 
|-
| Win
| align=center| 3–2
| Jeffry Lopez Madrigal
| TKO (punches)
| Xtreme Vale Todo 4
| 
| align=center| 1
| align=center| 3:45
| Guanacaste, Costa Rica
| 
|-
| Loss
| align=center| 2–2
| Juan Puig
| TKO (punches)
| Panama Fight League: Ultimate Combat Challenge 5
| 
| align=center| 2
| align=center| 3:37
| Panama City, Panama
| 
|-
| Win
| align=center| 2–1
| Rudy Saoudi
| TKO (leg kicks)
| 100% Fight: Contenders 4 
| 
| align=center| 2
| align=center| 1:43
| Paris, France
| 
|-
| Loss
| align=center| 1–1
| Charles Oliveira
| TKO (punches)
| Kawai Arena 1 
| 
| align=center| 1
| align=center| 1:01
| São Paulo, Brazil
| 
|-
| Win
| align=center| 1–0
| Unknown Fighter
| TKO (knees and punches)
| Rio Recreio Fighting
| 
| align=center| 1
| align=center| 2:00
| Rio de Janeiro, Brazil
| 
|-

Mixed martial arts exhibition record

|-
|Loss
|align=center|1–2
|Jesse Taylor
|Decision (Unanimous)
| The Ultimate Fighter: Team Garbrandt vs Team Dillashaw
|
|align=center|2
|align=center|5:00
|Las Vegas, Nevada, United States
|Eliminated from the TUF 25 tournament
|-
|Loss
|align=center|1–1
|Julian Erosa
|Decision (majority)
| The Ultimate Fighter: Team McGregor vs Team Faber
|
|align=center|2
|align=center|5:00
|Las Vegas, Nevada, United States
|Eliminated from the TUF 22 tournament
|-
| Win
| align=center| 1–0
| Artem Lobov
| Decision (majority) 
| The Ultimate Fighter: Team McGregor vs Team Faber
| 
| align=center| 2
| align=center| 5:00
|Las Vegas, Nevada, United States
| Entered in the TUF 22 tournament
|-

See also 
 List of current Brave CF fighters

References

External links 
 Mehdi Baghdad at Brave CF
 
 

1985 births
Living people
French male mixed martial artists
Mixed martial artists utilizing Muay Thai
French male kickboxers
French Muay Thai practitioners
French practitioners of Brazilian jiu-jitsu
Ultimate Fighting Championship male fighters
People from La Seyne-sur-Mer
French sportspeople of Algerian descent
Mixed martial artists utilizing Brazilian jiu-jitsu
Sportspeople from Var (department)